The Nicaraguan Olympic Committee is the National Olympic Committee representing Nicaragua at the Olympics. It is also the body responsible for Nicaragua representation at the Olympic Games.

History
The Nicaraguan Olympic Committee was founded in 1959 and recognised by the International Olympic Committee in the same year.

See also
 Nicaragua at the Olympics

References

External links
 Official website

National Olympic Committees
Oly
Nicaragua at the Olympics
1936 establishments in Nicaragua
Sports organizations established in 1959